I Got Loaded may refer to:

 "I Got Loaded" (Peppermint Harris song), 1951
 "I Got Loaded" (Camille Bob song), a song by Camille Bob, 1965